BharOS is a mobile operating system designed by IIT Madras. It is an Indian government-funded project to develop a free and open-source operating system (OS) for use in government and public systems. The Indian Express said it appears to be a forked version of Android. Since "BharOS can run most apps" it is presumably based on the Android Open Source Project.

History
Google is facing a crackdown from the Competition Commission of India (CCI) for its practices pertaining to its Android mobile operating system. There have been several demands for the need for an Indian app store that does not levy exorbitant fees for sales. The BharOS project aims to reduce the dependence on foreign operating systems in smartphones and promote the use of locally developed technology. It was developed by JandK Operations Private Limited (JandKops), which was incubated at IIT Madras. Minister for telecommunications and information technology Ashwini Vaishnaw and education minister Dharmendra Pradhan launched the operating system in a public event.

Features 
BharOS targets security-conscious groups. BharOS does not come with any preinstalled services or apps. This approach gives the user more freedom and control over the permissions that are available to apps on their device. Users can choose to grant permissions only to apps that they require to access certain features or data on their device. The software can be installed on commercially available handsets, providing users with a secure environment, the company stated in a statement. The new operating system will provide access to trusted apps via organisation-specific Private App Store Services (PASS), which is a list of curated apps that meet security and privacy standards. Security updates and bug fixes will be automatically installed rather than users having to manually check for updates and install them.

References 

State-sponsored Linux distributions
2023 software
Mobile Linux